Kivi veereb (Stone Rolls) is the third album by Estonian rock band Ruja.

Track listing

A-side
"Veerev kivi" (Rolling Stone) (Jaanus Nõgisto/Vladislav Koržets) - 5:46
"Murtud lilled" (Broken Flowers) (Igor Garšnek/Hando Runnel) - 3:31
"Lootuse laul" (Song of Hope) (S P Gulliver/Urmas Alender) - 4:34
"Kahe näoga Janus" (Two-Faced Janus) (Garšnek/Alender) - 3:07
"Isamaa pale" (Face of the Fatherland) (Garšnek/Runnel) - 2:06

B-side
"Meeste laul" (Men's Song) (Nõgisto) - 3:40
"Pime sõda" (Blind War) (Garšnek/Alender) - 2:56
"Oled sa järv" (Are You a Lake) (Garšnek/Alender) - 4:28
"Ahtumine" (Narrowing) (Nõgisto/Doris Kareva/Alender/Artur Alliksaar) - 3:32
"Valgusemaastikud" (Lightscapes) (Nõgisto/Kareva) - 2:17

Personnel

Urmas Alender (vocals)
Indrek Patte (vocals)
Jaanus Nõgisto (guitar, piano, backing vocals, percussion)
Igor Garšnek (keyboards, drums)
Vladislav Petšnikov (a.k.a. S P Gulliver) (bass, backing vocals, percussion)
Rein Joasoo (drums)
Arvo Urb (drums)

1987 albums
Ruja albums
Estonian-language albums